Scott "Hummer" Humeniuk is a Canadian retired professional ice hockey player, most notably with the Springfield Indians of the American Hockey League.

History

Junior career 

Humeniuk started his major junior career in 1987 with the Spokane Chiefs of the Western Hockey League, but saw limited action until the next season.  Despite a separated shoulder and a short suspension for a spearing incident, he was a top-four defenseman.

The following year Humeniuk was traded to the Moose Jaw Warriors after Chiefs' coach Butch Goring expressed dissatisfaction concerning his training camp performance.

Professional career 

Undrafted by any NHL team, Humeniuk signed a minor league contract with the Hartford Whalers.  His first professional action was a short stint with their Binghamton Whalers farm team in the American Hockey League in the 1990 season.  The following year, with the Whalers' new affiliation being with the Springfield Indians, he played most of the season with the Indians, participating in the team's seventh and final Calder Cup championship.  Humeniuk played parts of four seasons in all with Springfield, his best year coming in 1994 when, paired with veteran defenseman and First Team All-Star Rob Cowie, he scored 15 goals and 42 points to rank fourth on the team in scoring.

An unrestricted free agent thereafter, Humeniuk played for four AHL teams in the next two years before playing two seasons in Europe, with Lukko of the SM-liiga in 1997 and the Augsburger Panther of the Deutsche Eishockey Liga in 1998.  He returned to North America to play for the Baton Rouge Kingfish of the East Coast Hockey League in 1999 and led the team in defense scoring that season, but suffered a serious stroke later in the year, which forced his retirement.

Humeniuk continued to make his home in Baton Rouge thereafter, and his #55 jersey was retired by the team in 2002.

Career statistics

Awards
 WHL East Second All-Star Team – 1990

References

External links 

1969 births
Living people
Augsburger Panther players
Baton Rouge Kingfish players
Binghamton Whalers players
Canadian ice hockey forwards
Ice hockey people from Saskatchewan
Louisville Icehawks players
Lukko players
Minnesota Moose players
Moose Jaw Warriors players
Portland Pirates players
Providence Bruins players
Rochester Americans players
Spokane Chiefs players
Sportspeople from Saskatoon
Springfield Indians players